Fourth Dimension is a 1973 BBC Records release featuring recordings created by the BBC Radiophonic Workshop composer Paddy Kingsland. Although it was credited to "The BBC Radiophonic Workshop" it was the work of Kingsland alone, and was the first album of Workshop music to feature only one artist. It features theme tunes  used by BBC radio and television. The music prominently features VCS 3 and "Delaware" Synthi 100 synthesisers, both from Electronic Music Studios (London) Ltd, with a standard rock-based session band providing backing. The track "Reg" featured as the B-side to the 1973 single release of the Doctor Who theme.

It was reissued as part of the Record Store Day exclusive 6-CD box set Four Albums 1968 - 1978 29 August 2020.

Track listing

References

External links
mb21 Discography entry
MP3 versions of the tracks

BBC Radiophonic Workshop albums
1973 albums
Paddy Kingsland albums
BBC Records albums